Agriculture in Korea may refer to:

 Agriculture in South Korea
 Agriculture in North Korea